Carlos Alberto Filizzola Pallarés (born 24 July 1959, in Asunción) is a Paraguayan politician. He has been a member of the Senate of Paraguay since 2003, and the President of the political party Party for a Country of Solidarity since its creation in 2000. He was Interior Minister in the government of Fernando Lugo, resigning on 15 June 2012 following violent clashes during an eviction of landless farmers occupying land.

Filizzola graduated from medicine from the Universidad Nacional de Asunción in 1985. From 1989 to 1991 he was Assistant Secretary General of the Central Unitaria de Trabajadores (the main trade union federation of Paraguay). In 1991 he was the first democratically elected Intendente (mayor) of Asunción, governing from June 1991 to December 1996.

Filizzola was President of the National Encounter Party from April 1996 to March 1999. In 1996 he founded the Movimiento Participación Amplia, Integración Solidaridad (PAIS) faction within the party; in 2000, he led the faction out of National Encounter and founded Party for a Country of Solidarity. In the 1998 presidential election he was the vice presidential candidate of Domingo Laíno of the Authentic Radical Liberal Party.

Filizzola was President of the Senate of Paraguay from 1 July 2005 to 30 June 2006.

Filizzola is the cousin of Rafael Filizzola, also a Paraguayan politician.

References

1959 births
Living people
People from Asunción
Paraguayan people of Italian descent
National Encounter Party politicians
Party for a Country of Solidarity politicians
Interior Ministers of Paraguay
Members of the Senate of Paraguay
Presidents of the Senate of Paraguay
Paraguayan physicians
Universidad Nacional de Asunción alumni